Flint Run is a tributary of McElroy Creek,  long, in northern West Virginia in the United States.

According to the Geographic Names Information System, the stream has also been known historically by the name "Big Flint Run."  It collects a tributary named Little Flint Run a short distance upstream of its mouth.

See also
List of rivers of West Virginia

References 

Rivers of West Virginia
Rivers of Doddridge County, West Virginia
Rivers of Tyler County, West Virginia